Wolfgang Schädler (born 8 July 1958) is a Liechtensteiner luger. He competed at the 1976 Winter Olympics, the 1980 Winter Olympics and the 1984 Winter Olympics.

References

1958 births
Living people
Liechtenstein male lugers
Olympic lugers of Liechtenstein
Lugers at the 1976 Winter Olympics
Lugers at the 1980 Winter Olympics
Lugers at the 1984 Winter Olympics
Place of birth missing (living people)